The Florida Atlantic Owls football statistical leaders are individual statistical leaders of the Florida Atlantic Owls football program in various categories, including passing, rushing, receiving, total offense, defensive stats, kicking, and scoring. Within those areas, the lists identify single-game, single-season, and career leaders. The Owls represent Florida Atlantic University in the NCAA's Conference USA (C-USA).

Florida Atlantic began competing in intercollegiate football in 2001, so full box scores exist for every game the Owls have ever played. Therefore, unlike most college football teams, FAU's record book is not hampered by unavailability of statistics from games and seasons played decades ago. However, because the program is relatively new, the values on these lists are usually lower than those typically seen on lists like these.

These lists are updated through the end of the 2018 season.

Passing

Passing yards

Passing touchdowns

Rushing

Rushing yards

Rushing touchdowns

Receiving

Receptions

Receiving yards

Receiving touchdowns

Total offense
Total offense is the sum of passing and rushing statistics. It does not include receiving or returns.

Total offense yards

Touchdowns responsible for
"Touchdowns responsible for" is the official NCAA term for combined rushing and passing touchdowns. It does not include receiving or returns.

Defense

Interceptions

Tackles

Sacks

Kicking

Field goals made

Field goal percentage

Scoring
Florida Atlantic's 2017 football record book does not list a complete top 10 in overall scoring categories. Only the top 5 are listed for career and season categories, and only leaders for single-game categories. The lists of leaders entering the 2017 season have been supplemented by statistics from the 2017 and 2018 seasons.

Points

Touchdowns
These lists count touchdowns scored. Accordingly, these lists include rushing, receiving, and return touchdowns, but not passing touchdowns.

References

Florida Atlantic